Badrul Anam Saud is a Bangladeshi film director and scriptwriter. He won Bangladesh National Film Award for Best Director and Best Dialogue for the film Gohin Baluchor (2017).

Personal life
Saud is married to actress-politician Suborna Mustafa, who is 15 years older than saud.

Works

Films
 Khondo Golpo 1971 (2011)
 Gohine Baluchor (2017)
 Rupsha Nodir Banke (2020)

Television 
 Doll's House (2007)
 Tomay Hrid Majhare Rakhbo (2017)
 Akkhor Theke Uthe Asha Manush (2018)
 Lukochuri Lukochuri Golpo (2019)

References

Living people
1970s births
Bangladeshi film directors
Best Dialogue National Film Award (Bangladesh) winners
Place of birth missing (living people)
Year of birth missing (living people)